Killection is the tenth studio album by the Finnish rock band Lordi. It was released on 31 January 2020, via AFM Records. The band stated that the album is considered a 'fictional compilation' and would contain songs you would normally hear in the early 1970s to mid-1990s.

It is the first album to feature Hiisi on bass guitar, following the departure of longtime member OX.

Track listing

Personnel 
All information from the album booklet.

Lordi
 Mr Lordi – lead vocals, production, artwork, layout, all instruments (1, 6, 11, 15)
 Amen – guitars
 Mana – drums, backing vocals, executive producer, recording (additional vocals)
 Hella – keyboards, backing vocals
 Hiisi – bass guitar

Guest/session musicians
 Michael Monroe – saxophone on "Like a Bee to the Honey"
 Dylan Broda – vocals (1, 11)
 Joseph Terwilliger – additional vocals (1)
 Kari A. Kilgast – vocals, voice impersonations (1, 4)
 Ralph Ruiz – vocals (6, 11, 15)

Backing vocals
 Dylan Broda
 Tracy Lipp
 Isabella Larsson
 Toivo Hellberg
 Noora Kosmina
 Katja Auvinen
 Riitta Hyyppä
 Maria Jyrkäs
 Niki Westerback
 Netta Laurenne

Production

 Janne Halmkrona – executive producer
 Eero Kokko – photography
 Mikko Karmila – recording, mixing
 Janne Huotari – recording, mixing
 Rake Eskolin – mixing
 Juuso Nordlund – recording, mixing
 Toivo Hellberg – recording, mixing
 Mika Jussila – mastering
 Matti Vatanen – recording
 Nalle – recording
 Tracy Lipp – recording, mixing

Charts

References 

2020 albums
Lordi albums
AFM Records albums